Samarate is a town and comune located in the province of Varese, in the Lombardy region of northern Italy.  It received the honorary title of city with a presidential decree on February 2, 2009.  The frazione of Cascina Costa houses the headquarters of the former AgustaWestland, merged into Leonardo since 2016, one of the world's largest producer of helicopters.

Twin towns
 Yeovil, England

References

Cities and towns in Lombardy